The Rongbuk Glacier is located in the Himalaya of southern Tibet. Two large tributary glaciers, the East Rongbuk Glacier and the West Rongbuk Glacier, flow into the main Rongbuk Glacier. It flows north and forms the Rongbuk Valley north of Mount Everest. The famous Rongbuk Monastery is located at the northern end of the Rongbuk valley. Mount Everest is the source of the Rongbuk Glacier and East Rongbuk Glacier.

Discovery

The English climber George Mallory first explored the main Rongbuk Valley and its glacier while searching for possible routes to the summit of Mount Everest, during the first British Everest reconnaissance expedition of 1921.

On the same expedition, Oliver Wheeler first explored the East Rongbuk Glacier. His exploration below the Lhakpa La pass led him on 3 August 1921 to realise that the East Rongbuk Valley provided the key to a viable route to the summit of Everest. A few weeks later, a party consisting of George Mallory, Guy Bullock, and Oliver Wheeler explored the head of the valley via the Lhakpa La pass to become the first people to reach the North Col of Everest and set foot on the slopes of that mountain. See 1921 British Reconnaissance Expedition.

Location(s)

Route to Everest

Climbing expeditions attempting the normal route from Tibet use this glacier to reach the Advanced Base Camp of Mount Everest at the upper end of the East Rongbuk Glacier. From there, climbing expeditions try to summit Everest by the North Col and the northeast ridge.

Environmental

Since 2007, American mountaineer and film-maker David Breashears has been chronicling the rapid disappearance of the Rongbuk glacier due to global climate change. Breashears has retraced the steps of Mallory's 1921 expedition, revealing a significant loss of ice mass across the West, Main and East Rongbuk Glaciers. In partnership with Asia Society and MediaStorm, Breashears' GlacierWorks has made the photos available online. In 80 years, the Rongbuk has shrunk by more than 300 vertical feet across the entire glacier, approximately the height of the Statue of Liberty.

Image gallery

See also
Retreat of glaciers since 1850
Rongbuk Monastery
List of glaciers

References

External links

 NOAA.gov:   East Rongbuk Glacier, Mount Qomolangma
Greenpeace.org: "Expedition documents melting Himalayan glaciers"
Asia Society.org:  "On Thinner Ice" Project" — with photos of the Rongbuk Glacier.

Glaciers of China
Glaciers of Tibet
Mount Everest
Glaciers of the Himalayas